The University of St Andrews Students' Association is the organisation which represents the student body of the University of St Andrews. It was founded in 1885 and comprises the students' representative council and the Student Activities Forum (formerly the Students' Services Council).

The Students' Association is affiliated to, and a founding member of, the Coalition of Higher Education Students in Scotland but unlike many other students' unions in the UK is not a member of the National Union of Students, having rejected membership in November 2012, and most recently in a referendum in April 2022.

The University of St Andrews also has an Athletic Union.

Management
The Association is run by a student-majority Board and five sabbatical officers, each responsible for a separate aspect of student life: the Director of Wellbeing is in charge student welfare and programmes that run within the sector along with student democracy; the Director of Education is responsible for education, postgraduate studies and employability; the Director of Student Development and Activities supports the many student societies, as well as being involved in the provision of careers advice and personal development planning; the Director of Events and Services organises the major events of the year, such as Freshers' Week and the Graduation Ball, and regular Union club nights, as well as liaising with sponsors; the Association President is the overall leader of the Association and responsible for its image and strategic planning. The Board comprises seven student members and six non-student members. The student members are the four sabbatical officers and the Senior Officers of the SSC and SRC. Under the Universities (Scotland) Acts, all students of the University automatically become members of the Students' Association, however they are entitled to opt out of this.

Building 

The Students' Association Building (informally known as the Union) is located on St Mary's Place, St Andrews. Union facilities include several bars and the University's Student Support Services. In 2013 the Students' Association Building underwent a refurbishment.

Student Services Council
The Student Services Council (formerly Union Management Committee) supports the activities and events run by the Students' Association and the University's clubs and societies by providing facilities, organisation and funding. The Council comprises the following members:

Sabbatical Officers
 President of the Students' Association
 Director of Wellbeing
 Director of Education
 Director of Student Development and Activities
 Director of Events and Services
 Athletic Union President

Association Members
 Association Chair
 Alumni Officer
 Community Relations Officer
 Environment Officer
 LGBT+ Officer

Officers
 Broadcasting Officer (STAR: St Andrews Radio)
 Charities Convenor (Charities Campaign)
 Debates Officer (St Andrews Union Debating Society) 
 Design Team Convenor (Design Team)
 Entertainments Convenor (Ents Crew)
 Music Officer (Music is Love)
 Performing Arts Officer (Mermaids) 
 Postgraduate Officer (Postgraduate Society) 
 Societies Officer (Societies Committee) 
 SSC Arts Festival Convenor (On the Rocks)
 Volunteering Officer (SVS) 
 Member Without Portfolio

Student Representative Council
The Student Representative Council was instituted as the legal representative body for students of the University by the Universities (Scotland) Act 1889.

The SRC is responsible for representing students' interests to the management of the University and to local and national government.

The SRC comprises a number of officers, who chair the respective subcommittees, and members:

Sabbatical Officers
 President of the Students' Association
 Director of Wellbeing
 Director of Education
 Director of Student Development and Activities
 Director of Events and Services
 Athletic Union President

Association Members
 Association Chair
 Alumni Officer
 Community Relations Officer
 Environment Officer
 LGBT+ Officer

Officers
 Arts & Divinity Faculty President
 Science & Medicine Faculty President
 Postgraduate Academic Convenor
 Postgraduate Development Officer
 Accommodation Officer
 Member for First Year Students
 Member for Age Equality
 Member for Gender Equality
 Member for Racial Equality
 Member for Students with Disabilities
 Member for Widening Access and Participation
 Member without Portfolio

Other Members
 Principal Ambassador
 Rector's Assessor

Barron Theatre Closure

The Barron Theatre was a 55 seat black box theatre on the University campus. It was one of only three entirely student-run theatres in the UK. It was operated by the Mermaids Performing Arts Fund, a subcommittee of the Students' Association, notable alumni of which includes Deidre Mullins and Siobhan Redmond. In January 2020 it was announced that the theatre would be closed, despite major pushback from the student body. A campaign was launched called Save the Barron that garnered support from the student body and 2,800 signatures, but the decision for the student-run venue to close was not reversed.

As a replacement for the Barron Theatre, the University has granted Mermaids a residency in the Lawrence Levy Studio Theatre in the now University-owned Byre Theatre. The Studio is now colloquially known as the Barron @ the Byre and hosts many of the Mermaids' smaller performances throughout the year, alongside the Union StAge and the larger A.B. Paterson Auditorium in the Byre Theatre.

References

External links 
 St Andrews SA

Students' Association
St Andrews
Student organizations established in 1864